The rusty skink (Eremiascincus rubiginosus) is a species of skink found in Western Australia.

References

Eremiascincus
Reptiles described in 2018
Taxa named by Sven Mecke
Taxa named by Paul Doughty